Padumabad (also Romanized as Padūmābād; also known as Deh Paduma, Fadamābād, Padāmābād, Padomābād, and Qadamābād) is a village in Javaran Rural District, Hanza District, Rabor County, Kerman Province, Iran. At the 2006 census, its population was 97, in 22 families.

References 

Populated places in Rabor County